The Future Eaters in a 1994 non-fiction book by Australian author Tim Flannery. The book is an ecological history of Australia entailing how humans consume the resources they need for their future, and looking at the journey of the Aboriginal Australian people from Africa to the Australian mainland. Flannery's thesis has both been applauded and disagreed with.

References

1994 non-fiction books
Australian non-fiction books
Ecology books
Books by Tim Flannery

Books about Australian natural history
Books about Australian history
Books about New Zealand
Books about Indigenous Australians
Environmental non-fiction books